Ernest Bertram "Curly" Ross (March 31, 1880 – March 28, 1950) was a Major League Baseball pitcher. In two career games, he had a 1–1 record with a 7.41 ERA. He batted and threw left-handed.

Ross was born and died in Toronto.

External links

1880 births
1950 deaths
Baseball players from Toronto
Baltimore Orioles (1901–02) players
Canadian expatriate baseball players in the United States
Major League Baseball pitchers
Major League Baseball players from Canada